WKLB may refer to:

 WKLB (AM), a radio station (1290 AM) licensed to Manchester, Kentucky, United States
 WKLB-FM, a radio station (102.5 FM) licensed to Waltham, Massachusetts, United States